The 1922 Nevada gubernatorial election was held on November 7, 1922. Democratic nominee James G. Scrugham defeated Republican nominee John H. Miller with 53.88% of the vote.

Primary elections
Primary elections were held on September 5, 1922.

Democratic primary

Candidates
James G. Scrugham, Nevada Public Service Commissioner
James T. Boyd

Results

Republican primary

Candidates
John H. Miller
James Gault

Results

General election

Candidates
James G. Scrugham, Democratic
John H. Miller, Republican

Results

References

1922
Nevada
Gubernatorial